Rhaphithamnus venustus, known locally as Juan Bueno, is a species of plant in the family Verbenaceae. It is endemic to the Juan Fernández Islands, an archipelago west of Chile. It is threatened by habitat loss.

Juan Bueno flowers are an important source of nectar for the Juan Fernández firecrown (Sephanoides fernandensis), a hummingbird that is also only found on the Juan Fernández Islands but is almost extinct today. The hummingbird, in turn, may be an important pollinator for the plant.

References

Verbenaceae
Endemic flora of the Juan Fernández Islands
Vulnerable plants
Taxonomy articles created by Polbot